Deadtime Stories may refer to:

 Deadtime Stories (film), a 1986 American horror anthology film
 Deadtime Stories (2003 film), a 2003 animation short by Michael Dougherty
 Deadtime Stories (TV series), a 2012 TV series
 Deadtime Stories (novel), a series of children's horror fiction novels
 Deadtime Stories (video game), a 2012 video game